Aleksei Sergeyevich Pomerko (born 3 May 1990) is a Russian professional footballer. He plays for Arsenal Tula.

Club career
He made his professional debut in the Russian First Division in 2008 for FC Torpedo Moscow.

As a member of PFC Sochi, he became a silver medalist of the Russian Football National League.

Honours
Torpedo Moscow
 Russian Football National League: 2021–22

Career statistics

References

External links
 

1990 births
Sportspeople from Kalmykia
Living people
Russian footballers
Russia youth international footballers
Russia under-21 international footballers
Association football midfielders
FC Torpedo Moscow players
FC Amkar Perm players
FC Lokomotiv Moscow players
FC Volga Nizhny Novgorod players
FC Khimki players
FC Shinnik Yaroslavl players
FC Krasnodar players
PFC Krylia Sovetov Samara players
FC Orenburg players
FC Tom Tomsk players
PFC Sochi players
FC Arsenal Tula players
Russian First League players
Russian Premier League players
Russian Second League players